Bloomington Township is one of eleven townships in Monroe County, Indiana, United States. As of the 2010 census, its population was 44,167 and it contained 15,346 housing units.

History
Maple Grove Road Rural Historic District and Daniel Stout House are listed on the National Register of Historic Places.

Geography

Cities, towns, villages
 Bloomington (northern half, from Third Street north)

Unincorporated towns
 Arlington at 
 Cascade at 
 Dolan at 
 Eastern Heights at 
 Lancaster Park at 
 Marlin Hills at 
(This list is based on USGS data and may include former settlements.)

Cemeteries
The township contains these two cemeteries: Rose Hill and Valhalla Memory Gardens.

Major highways
  Interstate 69
  Indiana State Road 37
  Indiana State Road 46

Lakes
 Griffy Lake
 University Lake

School districts
 Monroe County Community School Corporation

Political districts
 Indiana's 9th congressional district
 State House District 61
 State Senate District 40

References
 
 United States Census Bureau 2008 TIGER/Line Shapefiles
 IndianaMap

External links
 Indiana Township Association
 United Township Association of Indiana
 City-Data.com page for Bloomington Township

Townships in Monroe County, Indiana
Bloomington metropolitan area, Indiana
Townships in Indiana